Neville Waller (17 September 1932 – 10 January 1998) was an Australian rules footballer, who played in the Victorian Football League (VFL).

He played as centre half back when the Magpies downed Geelong in the 1953 Grand Final, and played in a back pocket in the losing grand finals of 1955 and 1956 against Melbourne.

Waller was captain - coach of Wangaratta from 1959 to 1963, including their 1961 Ovens & Murray Football League premiership, in which he kicked 88 goals for Wangaratta FC in that time.

References

External links
 
 
 Tiger star puts the icing on the cake for 1961 Magpies via On Reflection
 Collingwood FC profile via Collingwood Forever

Australian rules footballers from Victoria (Australia)
Collingwood Football Club players
Collingwood Football Club Premiership players
1932 births
1998 deaths
One-time VFL/AFL Premiership players